Villebarou is a commune in the Loir-et-Cher department, Centre-Val de Loire, France. It is located 3.8 km (2.4 mi) from Blois.

History
Archaeological assessment suggests ancient settlement near the present-day Vendôme Route, with ceramics dating from the 1st and 2nd centuries.

Population

See also
Communes of the Loir-et-Cher department

References

Communes of Loir-et-Cher